McNary Dam is a 1.4-mile (2.2-km) long concrete gravity  run-of-the-river dam which spans the Columbia River. It joins Umatilla County, Oregon with Benton County, Washington, 292 miles (470 km) upriver from the mouth of the Columbia. It is operated by the U.S. Army Corps of Engineers' McNary Lock and Dam office. The dam is located a mile (2 km) east of the town of Umatilla, Oregon, and 8 miles (13 km) north of Hermiston, Oregon.  The dam was originally planned to be named Umatilla Dam, but the Flood Control Act of 1945 renamed the dam in honor of  Senator Charles L. McNary of Oregon, who had died the previous year.

The dam provides for slackwater navigation, hydroelectric power generation, recreation, wildlife habitat, and incidental irrigation.

Bills for the construction of a dam were introduced in the United States Congress as early as 1931. The United States House of Representatives rivers and harbors committee initially approved the project in April 1941; navigation, power generation, and national security were the major reasons cited for construction of the dam. Construction began in 1947, and was completed in 1954. Activation of all generating units was completed in 1957. Its capacity is 980 MW. There are two fish ladders for salmon and steelhead passage, one on each shore of the dam. The Washington side also has an 86-foot (26 m) wide, 683 foot (208 m) long navigation lock that lifts boats an average of 75 feet (23 m). The dam flooded the Umatilla Rapids, forming a reservoir called Lake Wallula. The lake extends 64 miles (103 km) up the Columbia to the US DOE Hanford Site. It also extends up the Snake River to the Ice Harbor Dam.

As with some other dams, it has two additional turbines whose purpose is to power the dam itself. That is, this dam is entirely self-sustaining. In the event of a large-scale grid outage, McNary would provide the black start capability necessary to restart other generation facilities. These two "station service" turbines are only capable of providing about three MW, compared to the 70 MW each of the other 14 turbines. These two turbines alternate service duty to provide the dam with its energy requirements.

McNary Dam is part of the Columbia River Basin system of dams.

Stats:
 Height: 
 Length: 
 Navigation lock:
 Single-lift
  wide
  long
 Powerhouse
 Fourteen 70,000-kilowatt units
 Total capacity: 980 megawatts
 Overload capacity: 1,127 MW
 Spillway
 Gates: 22
 Length:

See also 

 List of dams in the Columbia River watershed
 Hat Rock State Park
 Hydroelectric dams on the Columbia River
 List of lakes in Oregon
 McNary Dam Heliport

References

External links 

 McNary Lock and Dam – Walla Walla District – U.S. Army Corps of Engineers

Dams completed in 1954
Energy infrastructure completed in 1954
Energy infrastructure completed in 1957
Buildings and structures in Benton County, Washington
Dams on the Columbia River
Dams in Oregon
Dams in Washington (state)
Hydroelectric power plants in Washington (state)
Hydroelectric power plants in Oregon
Buildings and structures in Umatilla County, Oregon
Run-of-the-river power stations
United States Army Corps of Engineers dams
1954 establishments in Oregon
1954 establishments in Washington (state)
Gravity dams
Dams with fish ladders